The 2010 Formula 3 Euro Series season was the eighth championship year of the Formula 3 Euro Series. It began on 10 April at Circuit Paul Ricard and finished on 17 October at Hockenheim after eighteen races at nine meetings. Grids for the 2010 season were substantially down on the previous season; with a maximum of sixteen drivers taking part in any of the season's meetings, after teams Manor Motorsport, SG Formula, Carlin Motorsport, HBR Motorsport and Kolles & Heinz Union all pulled out to focus on other series.

On track, series veteran Edoardo Mortara returned to the formulae after a season competing for Arden International, and with seven victories – all coming in the Saturday, higher points-awarding races – during the season, Mortara took the championship at the wheel of his Signature-run Dallara-Volkswagen, giving Volkswagen their first Euro Series championship. Second place was not resolved until the final round, as Mortara's teammate Marco Wittmann and ART Grand Prix's Valtteri Bottas battled over the placing. Bottas had to win the final race to deny Wittmann of second place, but could only finish third and thus Wittmann completed the Signature 1–2, taking a single victory during the season at the first Hockenheim meeting. Bottas finished third for the second consecutive season, after his first two Euro Series wins – although he had previously won two successive Masters of Formula 3 events at Zandvoort, which is a non-championship race – at the Norisring and Oschersleben.

Bottas' teammate Alexander Sims also matched his final 2009 placing, taking fourth place with one victory once again, winning the opening sprint race of the season at Paul Ricard but took four further podium finishes to confirm fourth. Mücke Motorsport's Roberto Merhi completed the top five, taking his first Euro Series win in the first Hockenheim sprint race. Other sprint race victories included four for the Motopark Academy squad, including three successive for top rookie finisher – seventh in the championship – António Félix da Costa who won at the Nürburgring, Zandvoort and Brands Hatch having started each from the front row due to the series' reverse-grid system for the top eight finishers from the previous day's race. Kevin Magnussen, on a one-off outing from his usual commitments in the German Formula Three championship, also claimed a sprint race victory for Motopark at Valencia. Daniel Juncadella won the final race of the season at Hockenheim, while Jim Pla, ART's third driver, took the other victory at Oschersleben. Signature's 1–2 championship finish allowed the team to claim their respective championship, while the Nations Cup was won by Italy through Mortara.

Prize tests
The top drivers in the championship standings at the end of the year were rewarded with a wide range of prize tests in various other racing categories. The top three drivers – Mortara, Wittmann and Bottas – all received a Formula Renault 3.5 Series test.

As well as that, Mortara received a Deutsche Tourenwagen Masters test in the Audi A4, as he finished as top Volkswagen-engined driver as champion. Bottas, as top Mercedes-Benz driver received a test in the Mercedes-Benz C-Class.

Drivers and teams

Driver changes
 Changed Teams
 Mika Mäki: Signature → Motopark Academy
 Roberto Merhi: Manor Motorsport → Mücke Motorsport
 Edoardo Mortara: Kolles & Heinz Union → Signature
 Alexander Sims: ASL Mücke Motorsport → ART Grand Prix
 Marco Wittmann: ASL Mücke Motorsport → Signature

 Entering/Re-Entering Formula 3 Euro Series
 António Félix da Costa: Eurocup Formula Renault 2.0 & Formula Renault 2.0 Northern European Cup (Motopark Academy) → Motopark Academy
 Jimmy Eriksson: Formula Renault 2.0 Northern European Cup (Motopark Academy) → Motopark Academy
 Tobias Hegewald: GP3 Series (RSC Mücke Motorsport) → Motopark Academy
 Daniel Juncadella: Formula BMW Europe (EuroInternational) → Prema Powerteam
 Matias Laine: Formula Renault UK (CRS Racing) → Motopark Academy
 Kevin Magnussen: Eurocup Formula Renault 2.0 & Formula Renault 2.0 Northern European Cup (Motopark Academy) → Motopark Academy
 Nicolas Marroc: German Formula Three Championship (Racing Experience) → Prema Powerteam
 Carlos Muñoz: Eurocup Formula Renault 2.0 & Formula Renault 2.0 West European Cup (Epsilon Euskadi) → Mücke Motorsport
 Jim Pla: Formula BMW Europe (DAMS) → ART Grand Prix
 Adrian Quaife-Hobbs: Eurocup Formula Renault 2.0 & Formula Renault 2.0 Northern European Cup (Motopark Academy) → Motopark Academy
 Luís Sá Silva: Asian Formula Renault Challenge (Asia Racing Team) → Motopark Academy
 Laurens Vanthoor: German Formula Three Championship (Van Amersfoort Racing) → Signature
 Sandro Zeller: Formula Lista Junior (Jo Zeller Racing) → Jo Zeller Racing

 Leaving Formula 3 Euro Series
 Jules Bianchi: ART Grand Prix → GP2 Series (ART Grand Prix)
 Sam Bird: Mücke Motorsport → GP2 Series (ART Grand Prix)
 Mirko Bortolotti: Carlin Motorsport → GP3 Series (Addax Team)
 Andrea Caldarelli: SG Formula → Italian Formula Three Championship (Prema Powerteam)
 Johnny Cecotto Jr.: HBR Motorsport → GP2 Series (Trident Racing)
 Matteo Chinosi: Prema Powerteam → unknown
 Stefano Coletti: Prema Powerteam → Formula Renault 3.5 Series (Comtec Racing)
 Carlo van Dam: Kolles & Heinz Union & SG Formula → Le Mans Series (Atlas FX-Team Full Speed)
 Tom Dillmann: HBR Motorsport & Prema Powerteam → German Formula Three Championship (HS Technik)
 Pedro Enrique: Manor Motorsport → GP3 Series (ART Grand Prix)
 Victor García: Prema Powerteam → Formula Renault 3.5 Series (KMP Racing)
 Tiago Geronimi: Signature → unknown
 Brendon Hartley: Carlin Motorsport → Formula Renault 3.5 Series (Tech 1 Racing)
 Johan Jokinen: Kolles & Heinz Union → FIA Formula Two Championship
 Alexandre Marsoin: SG Formula → unknown
 Kevin Mirocha: HBR Motorsport → Eurocup Formula Renault 2.0 (SL Formula Racing)
 Nico Monien: Mücke Motorsport → German Formula Three Championship (URD Rennsport)
 Atte Mustonen: Motopark Academy → unknown
 César Ramos: Manor Motorsport → Italian Formula Three Championship (BVM – Target Racing)
 Jake Rosenzweig: Carlin Motorsport → Formula Renault 3.5 Series (Carlin)
 Tim Sandtler: Prema Powerteam → unknown
 Basil Shaaban: Prema Powerteam → unknown
 Adrien Tambay: ART Grand Prix → Auto GP (Charouz-Gravity Racing)
 Nick Tandy: Kolles & Heinz Union → Porsche Supercup (Konrad Motorsport)
 Jean-Karl Vernay: Signature → Firestone Indy Lights (Sam Schmidt Motorsports)
 Christian Vietoris: Mücke Motorsport → GP2 Series (Racing Engineering)
 Henkie Waldschmidt: SG Formula → unknown
 Robert Wickens: Kolles & Heinz Union → GP3 Series (Status Grand Prix)

Team changes
 Carlin Motorsport and Manor Motorsport left the series to participate in the new-for-2010 GP3 Series.
 SG Formula and Kolles & Heinz Union also left the series.
 Motopark Academy changed their engine supplier from Mercedes to Volkswagen.

Race calendar and results
 A nine-round calendar was announced on 18 December 2009. The calendar was reduced to eight rounds on 29 January 2010 after the Euro Series decided to skip the Deutsche Tourenwagen Masters events at Lausitz and the second Hockenheim round. However, the series did add a season-closing round at Circuit de Nevers Magny-Cours. This was later removed, in place of a round at Paul Ricard in support of the Le Mans Series, with the second Hockenheim round returning.

Standings

Drivers
Points are awarded as follows:

† — Drivers did not finish the race, but were classified as they completed over 90% of the race distance.

Teams

Nations Cup

See also
 2010 British Formula 3 season
 2010 German Formula Three season
 2010 GP3 Series season
 2010 Masters of Formula 3

Notes

References

External links
The official website of the Formula 3 Euro Series

Formula 3 Euro Series seasons
Euro Series
Formula 3 Euro Series